The Queen Sofía Composition Prize is a Spanish symphonic composition prize created in 1983. Organized by the Ferrer-Salat Music Foundation, the winner is currently awarded €25,000 (€100,000 from 2021) and the winning composition is premiered by the RTVE Symphony the following year.

Winners

References

Classical music awards
Awards established in 1983
Music competitions in Spain